Point of Fork Plantation is a historic plantation house and farm located near Columbia, Fluvanna County, Virginia.  The main house was built about 1830, and is a two-story, five bay, brick dwelling in the Greek Revival style. It measures 50 feet by 40 feet and is topped by a shallow hipped roof with balustrade.  The front facade features a large two-story tetrastyle Greek Doric order portico. Also on the property are a contributing servant's house and office.  The house is a twin of Glen Arvon, as they were built by brothers William and James Galt.  In March 1865, Federal troops under General Philip Sheridan occupied the plantation and Sheridan set up headquarters in the house.

It was listed on the National Register of Historic Places in 1974.

References

Plantation houses in Virginia
Houses on the National Register of Historic Places in Virginia
Greek Revival houses in Virginia
Houses completed in 1830
Houses in Fluvanna County, Virginia
National Register of Historic Places in Fluvanna County, Virginia
1830 establishments in Virginia